Nancy Jennifer, previously credited as Baby Jennifer, is an Indian actress who has appeared in Tamil language films. After making her debut as a child artiste, Jennifer has also featured in supporting and lead roles.

Career
Nancy Jennifer began acting as a child actress and featured in Vasanth's Nerrukku Ner (1997), as a small child who is caught up by her parents’ divorce. She later appeared in films including Asokavanam and Ghilli (2004), portraying Vijay's sister. In the late 2000s, she became a lead actress and appeared in the low-budget films Thozha (2008) and Puthiya Payanam. After being unable to garner success as a lead actress, Jennifer has regularly featured as a supporting actress and as a host for STAR Vijay.

Selected filmography

Television

References

Indian film actresses
Actresses in Tamil cinema
Living people
Child actresses in Tamil cinema
20th-century Indian actresses
21st-century Indian actresses
Actresses from Chennai
Actresses in Telugu cinema
Tamil television actresses
Actresses in Tamil television
1990 births